Sex, Drugs & Video Games is a mixtape by American rapper and record producer David Banner from Mississippi. It was self-released on May 22, 2012 in an attempt to profoundly change the music industry.

Track listing

 "Castle In Brooklyn" contains a sample of "Brass Monkey" by the Beastie Boys
 "Believe" contains a sample of "Love U 4 Life by Jodeci

References

2012 albums
David Banner albums
Albums produced by David Banner